Scott B. Sumner (born 1955) is an American economist. He was previously the Director of the Program on Monetary Policy at the Mercatus Center at George Mason University, a Research Fellow at the Independent Institute, and a professor at Bentley University in Waltham, Massachusetts. His economics blog, The Money Illusion, popularized the idea of nominal GDP targeting, which says that the Federal Reserve and other central banks should target nominal GDP, real GDP growth plus the rate of inflation, to better "induce the correct level of business investment".

In May 2012, Chicago Fed President Charles L. Evans became the first sitting member of the Federal Open Market Committee (FOMC) to endorse the idea.

After Ben Bernanke's announcement on September 13, 2012, of a new round of quantitative easing, which open-endedly committed the FOMC to purchase $40 billion agency mortgage-backed securities per month until the "labor market improves substantially", some media outlets began hailing him as the "blogger who saved the economy", for popularizing the concept of nominal income targeting.

Academic career
Sumner received a PhD in economics from the University of Chicago in 1985. His published research focuses on prediction markets and monetary policy.

In the wake of the 2008 financial crisis, Sumner began authoring a blog where he vocally criticized the view that the United States economy was stuck in a liquidity trap. Sumner advocates that central banks such as the Federal Reserve create a futures market for the level of nominal gross domestic product (NGDP, also known as nominal income), and adjust monetary policy to achieve a nominal income target on the basis of information from the market. Monetary authorities generally choose to target other metrics, such as inflation, unemployment, the money supply or hybrids of these and rely on information from the financial markets, indices of unemployment or inflation, etc. to make monetary policy.

In 2015, Sumner published The Midas Paradox: A New Look at the Great Depression and Economic Instability. The book argued that the Depression was greatly extended by repeated gold market shocks and New Deal wage policies.

Market monetarism 

A school of economics known as market monetarism has coalesced around Sumner's views; The Daily Telegraph international business editor Ambrose Evans-Pritchard has referred to Sumner as the "eminence grise" of market monetarism. In 2012, the Chronicle of Higher Education referred to Sumner as "among the most influential" economist bloggers, along with Greg Mankiw of Harvard University and Paul Krugman of Princeton. In 2012, Foreign Policy ranked Sumner jointly with Federal Reserve chair Ben Bernanke 15th on its list of 100 top global thinkers.

Nominal GDP targeting

Sumner contends that inflation is "measured inaccurately and does not discriminate between demand versus supply shocks" and that "Inflation often changes with a lag...but nominal GDP growth falls very, very quickly, so it'll give you a more timely signal stimulus is needed". He argued that monetary policy can offset fiscal austerity policies such as those pursued by the British government in the wake of the 2007 economic crisis.

In April 2011, the Reserve Bank of New Zealand responded to Sumner's critique of inflation targeting, arguing that a nominal GDP target would be too technically complicated, and make monetary policy difficult to communicate. By November 2011, however, economists from Goldman Sachs were advocating that the Federal Reserve adopt a nominal income target. Nathan Sheets, a former top official at the Federal Reserve and the head of international economics at Citigroup, proposed that the Federal Reserve adopt a nominal consumption target instead.

Sumner has argued that one cannot account for the impact of fiscal policy without first considering how monetary policy may affect the outcome; fiscal stimulus may not succeed if monetary policy is tightened in response. Economic journalists have referred to this as the Sumner Critique, akin to the Lucas critique. Summarizing this thinking, The Economist suggested that

Other views 
Sumner's views have been described as libertarian, and he has also used the label as a self-description.

China 
Sumner has lamented what he sees as "anti-China" sentiment in the United States and Europe. In one post titled "cHiNa iS tHe reAL thReAt", using alternating caps, Sumner implies that Russia's military support of Alexander Lukashenko represents a bigger threat to the United States. Sumner has also juxtaposed the actions of China and Russia in another blog, where he said "I notice that Russia (which has far more nukes than China), actually does invade other countries. We worry that China might invade other countries". Sumner, frustrated by people he calls "morons", has attempted to prevent people from associating his views with support of the Chinese Communist Party (CCP), has contrasted China, which he calls "a very good country of 1.4 billion people", with the CCP, which he describes as "a very evil government".

Chinese economy 
Sumner is bullish on the Chinese economy, and has mocked various predictions made throughout the 2010s suggesting that the Chinese real estate market would collapse. Sumner has attributed the growth of the Chinese economy to economic growth in Europe. He also subscribes to a win-win philosophy regarding US-Chinese trade relations, describing one trade deal between the two countries as "a big win for China. And that’s means it’s a win for Americans".

Sumner does not believe that China is manipulating its currency.

Sumner has praised China's high-speed rail network.

Covid-19 pandemic 
Sumner has criticized U.S. intelligence's findings in the origins of Covid-19, and opined that the virus could have originated in Thailand or Laos, citing a Wall Street Journal article and a Bloomberg article, respectively.

Sumner has praised China's handling of the Covid-19 pandemic, and has been critical of the handling of the pandemic in the United States and Europe, saying in one blog that "China succeeded against a crisis that was objectively far greater than the crisis faced by Europe and America". While the strict measures taken by the Chinese government, such as officials locking residents in their home to enforce quarantines, and assigning residents color codes to evaluate whether they should quarantine, have been criticized by journalists, Sumner praised the country's ability "to control the epidemic under difficult circumstances".

Sumner has criticized the slow development of the COVID-19 vaccines, blaming medical ethicists, and said that "thousands died" as a result of delays to the vaccines' development.

Donald Trump 
Sumner is a vocal critic of Donald Trump, calling him "Putin's puppy", and opining that he has a "contempt for democracy". Sumner believes that Trump has a "longstanding infatuation" with Putin, citing a comment Trump made in which he called Putin "a leader far more than our president", referring to Barack Obama. Trump is a frequent target for criticism on his blog, as is Tucker Carlson, and Vladimir Putin; this has resulted in a number of ad hominem insults being directed at him in his blog's comment section. Sumner has taken to banning comments from people he calls "Russian trolls". Some of the deleted messages were links to articles published in the medical journal The Lancet. These articles were contrary to the views of the prevailing orthodoxy. Sumner has repeatedly used the term "Trump derangement syndrome" to describe support of Donald Trump, and has described support for Trump as "a personality cult". Sumner also believes that Trump encouraged China "to put Uighurs into concentration camps", citing a disputed claim made by former National Security Advisor John Bolton.

Sumner viewed the Trump administration's stance towards China as detrimental to the economies of both countries. Sumner views the two countries' 2019 trade agreement, negotiated in part by the Trump administration, as "a loss for the Trump administration", and added "I expected the Trump administration to lose, but not this badly". Sumner describes Trump's policy as "brazenly trying to steal money from the Chinese, and is igniting a cold war with China". Sumner has been critical of Trump's efforts to ban TikTok and WeChat in the United States, despite privacy concerns about TikTok.

Sumner has lambasted Trump for his handling of the Covid-19 pandemic, saying that Trump "would gladly kill enormous numbers of Americans to get re-elected" and that it was responsible for large amounts of American deaths. In one blog post, Sumner pondered whether Trump's policy had killed Americans, and stated that this was designed to make Trump "look good".

Sumner has been critical of the American media's response to the Trump presidency, saying that "the press has gone easy on Trump", and said that media outlets have a "shameful double standard" when it comes to covering Trump.

TikTok 
Sumner hails the success of TikTok as "a truly heartwarming story of entrepreneurial success", and has criticized the Trump administration's efforts to ban it, despite concerns over potential privacy violations.

Personal life
Well known in Bentley's economics department as a "technophobe," Sumner, who purchased his first cell phone in 2011, apparently "triggered expressions of surprise and amusement when he informed his colleagues that he was starting a blog."

Bibliography

Books

Articles

The Hill

U.S. News & World Report

Mercatus Center

Cato Institute

Others

See also
 Market monetarism
 Nominal income target

References

External links
 Mercatus.org
 Faculty webpage at Bentley University
 Blog
 Marginal revolutionaries, The Economist, December 31, 2011
 

1955 births
20th-century American economists
21st-century American economists
21st-century American male writers
21st-century American non-fiction writers
American libertarians
American male bloggers
American bloggers
Bentley University faculty
Living people
Mercatus Center
Monetarists
Monetary economists
University of Chicago alumni